The Lightyear 0 (formerly the Lightyear One) is an all-solar-electric car by Lightyear. Production was originally scheduled to start in 2021, with a starting price of  incl. VAT. The first units were delivered in December 2022. In January 2023, Lightyear announced that it was halting production of the 0 model, and that Atlas Technologies B.V., the subsidiary responsible for the manufacture of the Lightyear 0, would be allowed to go bankrupt.

Overview

The Lightyear company claims the 782 solar cells across the car can add  of range per day during summer. The aerodynamics of the vehicle were stated to produce a record-low . 

The car is all-wheel drive, with four in-wheel electric hub motors powered by a low-mounted battery. It seats five adults and luggage.

History
The solar panel design was born out of the Solar Team Eindhoven's solar-powered cars for the World Solar Challenge. Design work on the Lightyear 0 was carried out together with GranStudio in Italy.

Price and availability
Announced on 25 June 2019, production was scheduled to start in 2021, mentioning a starting price of  excl. VAT. In September 2021, Lightyear were reported to have raised  to bring the vehicle to production, and delivering the first units in 2022, for the price of  excl. VAT. The company announced in December 2022 that production had begun, at a rate of one car per week. Availability was limited to customers in the EU, Switzerland, Norway and the UK. However, in January 2023 Lightyear announced that it was halting production of the 0 model, redirecting their efforts towards production of Lightyear 2; Atlas Technologies B.V., the subsidiary responsible for the manufacture of the Lightyear 0, would be allowed to go bankrupt.

References

External links

 

Electric concept cars
Solar-powered vehicles
Upcoming car models
Cars introduced in 2019
Automotive industry in the Netherlands